The University Athletic Association of the Philippines (UAAP) Overall Championship is awarded to the school with the highest point total in the different UAAP events. It was first awarded in UAAP Season 10. Member universities currently compete in fifteen sports to vie for the overall championship, namely, badminton, baseball, basketball, beach volleyball, chess, fencing, football, judo, softball, swimming, table tennis, taekwondo, tennis, track and field, and volleyball.

The University of Santo Tomas holds the distinction of having the most overall championships with 66 titles wherein it won 45 collegiate division overall championships in the 74 seasons that the title was awarded and 21 high school division overall championships out of 26 seasons.

Point system
The current point system gives 15 points to the champion team in a certain UAAP event, 12 to the runner-up, and 10 to the third placer. The following points are given in consequent order of finish: 8, 6, 4, 2 and 1.

List of overall champions

Early years
The UAAP was founded in 1938 by Far Eastern University (FEU), National University (NU), the University of the Philippines (UP) and the University of Santo Tomas (UST).

First expansion
In 1952, Adamson University, Manila Central University (MCU), the University of Manila (UM) and the University of the East (UE) were added as probationary members; after two years, only MCU and UE were retained. MCU then pulled out of the league in 1962. In 1970, Adamson was readmitted to the league.

Second expansion
Ateneo de Manila University (AdMU) was added in 1978.

Third expansion
In 1986, De La Salle University (DLSU) was added.

Final Four era
The current tournament format was introduced to the league.

Number of championships per university

Statistics
 Last overall championship

Seniors' division:
Adamson Soaring Falcons: none
Ateneo Blue Eagles: none
De La Salle Green Archers: Season 78 (2015–2016)
FEU Tamaraws: Season 44 (1981–1982)
NU Bulldogs: Season 49 (1986–1987)
UE Red Warriors: Season 37 (1974–1975)
UP Fighting Maroons: Season 60 (1997–1998)
UST Growling Tigers: Season 84 (2021–2022)

Juniors' division:
Adamson Baby Falcons: none
Ateneo Blue Eaglets: Season 64 (2001–2002)
De La Salle Junior Archers: none
FEU Baby Tamaraws: none
NU Bullpups: none
UE Junior Warriors: Season 76 (2013–2014)
UPIS Junior Maroons: none
UST Tiger Cubs: Season 81 (2019–2020)

 Overall championship streaks

See also 
 NCAA General Championship

References

External links
WebArchive: UAAP Championship Scoreboard at www.uaapgames.com
WebArchive: The Official Website of the UAAP 61st Season, hosted by UE
WebArchive: UAAP Season 61: UAAP Champions 1938-1997
WebArchive - The Varsitarian - "From fraternity to glamour league" 
WebArchive: UBelt.com - UAAP Overall Championship Tally - Season 64-67
At last! UE Wins the UAAP Juniors Division Overall Championship! 
University of Santo Tomas - "UST holds the record of having won the most General Championships, totaling to 34 Senior Division General Championships" (as of Season 69)
Peyups.com: UP places second in 63rd UAAP season. (UST is overall champion)
Ateneo de Manila High School: Interschool Athletics Campaign

Overall